Two-Track-MAC algorithm has been selected as a finalist for NESSIE in November 2000 and was conceived as a fast and reliable method to hash data. The development was attended by Bart of Van Rompay (Eng.) From the Leuven University (Katholieke Universiteit Leuven)  Belgium and Bert den Boer of debis AG (Germany).

It uses two hash functions in parallel, making it similar to MDC-2.

External links
 New (Two-Track-)MAC Based on the Two Trails of RIPEMD

Message authentication codes